Lyrico (Italian "lyric") can designate the following voice parts:

 Soprano lirico (lyric soprano)
 Lirico spinto (spinto soprano)
 Tenore lirico (lyric tenor)